Kathryn Davis is an American novelist. She is a recipient of a Lannan Literary Award.

Life
Davis has taught at Skidmore College, and is now senior fiction writer in the Writing Program in Arts & Sciences at Washington University in St. Louis.

Davis lives in Montpelier, Vermont, with her husband, the novelist and essayist Eric Zencey.  The couple has one daughter, Daphne, who is a graduate student at Syracuse University.

Awards
She is a recipient of the Janet Heidiger Kafka Prize, the Morton Dauwen Zabel Award from the American Academy of Arts and Letters in 1999, a 2000 Guggenheim Fellowship, and a Lannan Literary Award for Fiction in 2006.

Reception 
Kathryn Davis' work has been met with mostly positive reviews by critics. The Thin Place was lauded by Christian Science Monitor as "impressively creative." New York Times Book Review called it "divinely inspired . . . if at times a little aimless." San Francisco Chronicle said "Davis' particular talent is her ability to juggle Big Ideas and the minutiae of daily life in an engaging, unpretentious way." The Village Voice said Davis' writing is "ripe with evocative prose that always manages to undercut itself neatly." The Washington Post reviewed The Thin Place and called it "sly and playful, but also serious about exposing the spiritual lining of everyday phenomena."

Davis' first memoir, Aurelia, Aurélia, was met with positive reviews. Los Angeles Times said Davis' ability to "sidestep reality has allowed her to successfully transcend the conventional let-me-tell-you style of memoir." The New York Times said her memoir "mimics the atemporal quality of the episodes that give meaning to life." Chicago Review of Books said her memoir teaches an important lesson: "it is only through our remarkable apparatus of association that we will find meaning in life."

Novels
 
 The Girl Who Trod on a Loaf. Knopf. 1993; Little, Brown. 2003. 
 Hell. Ecco Press. 1998; Little, Brown. 2003. 
 
 
 The Thin Place. Little, Brown and Company. 2006. ; Little, Brown. 2007. 
 
Silk Road. Graywolf Press. 2019. ISBN 978-1-55597-829-7
Aurelia, Aurélia. Graywolf Press. 2022.

Notes

20th-century American novelists
Living people
21st-century American novelists
Skidmore College faculty
Washington University in St. Louis faculty
Novelists from Vermont
American women novelists
20th-century American women writers
21st-century American women writers
Novelists from Missouri
Novelists from New York (state)
1946 births